The 2018 WAC men's basketball tournament was the postseason men's basketball tournament for the Western Athletic Conference for the 2017–18 season. All tournament games will be played at the Orleans Arena in Paradise, Nevada, from March 8–10, 2018. The winner of the tournament will receive the conference's automatic bid to the NCAA tournament. Regular-season champion New Mexico State also won the WAC Tournament championship and received the conference's automatic bid to the NCAA tournament.

Seeds

All eight teams in the WAC were eligible to compete in the conference tournament. Teams were seeded by record within the conference, with a tiebreaker system to seed teams with identical conference records.

Schedule and results

Bracket

Source

References

External links
2018 Western Athletic Conference Men's Basketball Championship Bracket
2018 Western Athletic Conference Men's Basketball Championship

WAC men's basketball tournament
Tournament
WAC men's basketball tournament
WAC men's basketball tournament
Basketball competitions in the Las Vegas Valley
College basketball tournaments in Nevada
College sports tournaments in Nevada